The Tel Aviv Heat is the first professional Israeli rugby union team. Based in Tel Aviv, the team competes annually in the Eastern Conference of the Rugby Europe Super Cup, alongside RC Batumi and The Black Lion of Georgia as well as the Romanian Wolves of Romania.

Current squad

See also
:Category:Tel Aviv Heat players
 Israel national rugby union team
 Rugby union in Israel

References

Rugby clubs established in 2021
Sport in Tel Aviv
Rugby union in Israel
2021 establishments in Israel
Rugby Europe Super Cup